Nantlle was a railway station located in Talysarn, a neighbouring village to Nantlle, in Gwynedd, Wales.

From 1828 the narrow gauge, horse-drawn Nantlle Railway ran from wharves at Caernarfon through  and through the site of the future Nantlle station to slate quarries around the village of Nantlle. The Nantlle quarries and railway were very much still in business, so they continued to send their products to Caernarfon by transhipping them onto the new railway at Tyddyn Bengam a short distance north of Penygroes.

This arrangement continued until 1872 when the LNWR repeated the earlier process and built a standard gauge branch partly on the Nantlle Railway trackbed from Penygroes to Talysarn, where it built a wholly new passenger station which it called Nantlle, though in reality the branch only reached half way to the village of Nantlle. This station included a locomotive servicing area at its eastern end.

From then onwards products were transshipped from the quarry wagons onto standard gauge wagons in the goods yard at "Nantlle" station. The narrow gauge wagons were manoeuvred by horse and by hand, a way of working which, remarkably, survived until 1963.

Passenger traffic along the branch, which was less than a mile and a half long, was not heavy. The station closed to normal passenger traffic in 1932, though excursion traffic (mostly outbound from Nantlle) continued until 1939.

The station closed completely in 1963. The station building was still standing in 2012, though most other infrastructure had long been built over.

References

Sources

Further material

External links
 The station site on a navigable OS Map, via National Library of Scotland
 The station and line, via Rail Map Online
 The line NAT1 with mileages, via Railway Codes
 Images of the station, via Yahoo
 The station and line, via Nantlle Valley History
 The station and line, via LNWR Society

Disused railway stations in Gwynedd
Railway stations in Great Britain opened in 1872
Railway stations in Great Britain closed in 1917
Railway stations in Great Britain opened in 1919
Railway stations in Great Britain closed in 1932
Former London and North Western Railway stations